Oaks Hotels, Resorts & Suites  is an accommodation provider with over 60 properties predominantly located in Australia and New Zealand, and a smaller number of sites in the United Arab Emirates, India, Qatar and Lebanon. Originally founded in Australia in 1991, Oaks Hotels, Resorts & Suites form part of a larger global company, Minor International.

Introduction 
Oaks Hotels, Resorts & Suites  is a hospitality chain that specialises in self-contained apartment accommodation. The company is a Management Letting Rights (MLR) business  and its portfolio features 52 properties (as of 30 November 2015) under its management in cities across Australia, New Zealand, Thailand and the United Arab Emirates.

History  
Oaks Hotels, Resorts & Suites was founded in 1991 on Queensland’s Sunshine Coast, and was subsequently acquired by Minor International in July 2011. In addition to its Australian and New Zealand properties, Oaks also has apartments in Thailand, the United Arab Emirates, Qatar, Lebanon, and India.

There are currently 64 Oaks properties in operation globally, with 58 of these located in Australia & New Zealand.

References 

Hotel chains in Australia
Hotels in New Zealand
Australian brands
Minor International